The 1976 NCAA Division I basketball tournament involved 32 schools playing in single-elimination play to determine the national champion of men's NCAA Division I college basketball. It began on March 13, 1976, and ended with the championship game on March 29 in Philadelphia. A total of 32 games were played, including a national third-place game.

Indiana, coached by Bob Knight, won the national title with an 86–68 victory in the final game over Michigan, coached by Johnny Orr. Kent Benson of Indiana was named the tournament's Most Outstanding Player.

Notably, this was the first time that two teams from the same conference (the Big Ten) played in the title game. Also, this was the last men's Division I tournament to date to feature two unbeaten teams, as both Indiana and Rutgers entered the tournament unbeaten. To date, Indiana is the last team to go the entire season undefeated at 32–0.  Both advanced to the Final Four, with Indiana winning the title and Rutgers losing to Michigan in the semifinals and UCLA in the third-place game. This had been the last tournament both Duke and Kentucky missed in the same year until 2021.

This tournament was also the first since the creation of the NCAA men's tournament in 1939 in which no regional third-place games were played. In the first two NCAA tournaments (1939 and 1940), the West Regional held a third-place game, but the East (the only other regional of that day) did not. The East began holding its own third-place game in 1941, and from that point through 1975 each regional held a third-place game. This was the second year of the 32-team field, and the
NCAA announced the selections several days prior to the end of the regular 

As site of the Continental Congress and signing of the Declaration of Independence, Philadelphia  also served as host for the 1976 NBA All-Star Game, the 1976 National Hockey League All-Star Game, and the 1976 Major League Baseball All-Star Game at which President Ford threw out the first pitch. The 1976 Pro Bowl was an exception and was played in New Orleans, likely due to weather concerns.

Schedule and venues

The following are the sites that were selected to host each round of the 1976 tournament:

First round
March 13
East Region
 Charlotte Coliseum, Charlotte, North Carolina
 Providence Civic Center, Providence, Rhode Island
Mideast Region
 University of Dayton Arena, Dayton, Ohio
 Athletic & Convocation Center, South Bend, Indiana
Midwest Region
 UNT Coliseum, Denton, Texas
 Allen Fieldhouse, Lawrence, Kansas
West Region
 McArthur Court, Eugene, Oregon
 ASU Activity Center, Tempe, Arizona

Regional semifinals and finals (Sweet Sixteen and Elite Eight)
March 18 and 20
East Regional, Greensboro Memorial Coliseum, Greensboro, North Carolina
Mideast Regional, LSU Assembly Center, Baton Rouge, Louisiana
Midwest Regional, Freedom Hall, Louisville, Kentucky
West Regional, Pauley Pavilion, Los Angeles, California

National semifinals, 3rd-place game, and championship (Final Four and championship)
March 27 and 29
The Spectrum, Philadelphia, Pennsylvania

Philadelphia became the 15th city, and the Spectrum the 16th venue, to host a Final Four. It was just the third active NBA arena to host a Final Four, after the old Madison Square Garden and the Los Angeles Memorial Sports Arena. Like the majority of previous Final Four venues, this was the Spectrum's first time hosting tournament games of any kind, a practice which mostly died shortly after; the NCAA made it a practice to have Final Four venues have at least a "test run" hosting earlier games the year before by the 1980s.  Other than the Spectrum, only one other arena made its debut in 1976. The LSU Assembly Center made its debut in the 1976 tournament, the first time the city of Baton Rouge hosted games, and the first time since 1942 that the state of Louisiana hosted. All the venues in the tournament saw action since this tournament, although this would mark the final time for the Charlotte Coliseum to host a regional round; it would only host sub-regionals afterwards.

Baton Rouge hosted the Mideast Regional even though it is west of Louisville, the Midwest Regional host. This was because LSU was (and still is) a member of the Southeastern Conference, whose champion was automatically assigned to the Mideast, and Louisville was a member of the Missouri Valley Conference when it was named to host this regional (the Cardinals moved to the brand-new Metro Conference for the 1975-76 season, and remained until it disbanded in 1995); the champions of the MVC and Metro were automatically assigned to the Midwest. Beginning in 1980, the NCAA no longer automatically assigned conference champions to their natural geographic region in order to have the flexibility to balance the four regional brackets.

Teams

Bracket
* – Denotes overtime period

East region – Greensboro, North Carolina

Midwest region – Louisville, Kentucky

Mideast region – Baton Rouge, Louisiana

West region – Los Angeles

Final Four – Philadelphia, Pennsylvania

See also
 1976 NCAA Division II basketball tournament
 1976 NCAA Division III basketball tournament
 1976 National Invitation Tournament
 1976 NAIA Division I men's basketball tournament
 1976 National Women's Invitation Tournament

References

NCAA Division I men's basketball tournament
Ncaa
Basketball in the Dallas–Fort Worth metroplex
NCAA Division I men's basketball tournament, 1976
NCAA Division I men's basketball tournament
NCAA Division I men's basketball tournament